Joey Batey (born 1989) is an English actor, musician, singer, and songwriter. He is known for portraying the bard Jaskier in the Netflix fantasy series The Witcher, where he sang "Toss a Coin to Your Witcher", as well other songs featured in the series.

Early life and education
Joey Batey was born in Newcastle upon Tyne. He has said he grew up in a "musical family" and has always been around music. Whilst at Cambridge, he co-wrote and performed the comedic sketch show Good Clean Men with Alex Owen, Ben Ashenden and others.

Career

Acting

Batey's film debut was in the 2013 British thriller, Murder on the Home Front, directed by Geoffrey Sax. In 2014, he appeared in The Riot Club directed by Lone Scherfig. In 2017, Paul McGuigan cast him as Eddie in Film Stars Don't Die in Liverpool. Batey also played in the British TV series Strike (2017), and In The Dark (2017). He appeared in the series Knightfall in 2017–2018, a 14th century period piece centered on the Knights Templar, where he played the role of Pierre, a spy after information on the Holy Grail.

As of 2021, Batey was continuing to play the character of the bard, Jaskier, in Netflix's adaptation of The Witcher, based on the Polish novel series of the same name.

Musical performance
Batey is a vocalist and musician for the indie folk band The Amazing Devil, as well as the primary writer and composer. The band has released three albums including Love Run (2016), and The Horror and the Wild (2020). Their most recent album, Ruin, was released on 31 October 2021.

In Netflix's adaptation of The Witcher, Batey has performed the following songs featured in the series: "Toss a Coin to Your Witcher", "The Fishmonger's Daughter" and "Her Sweet Kiss", as well as "Burn Butcher Burn", "Whoreson Prison Blues" and "The Golden One".

Filmography

Film

Television

Video Games

Further reading

References

External links 
 
 The Amazing Devil Official Website
 The Amazing Devil on Bandcamp

Living people
Alumni of Robinson College, Cambridge
British film actors
British stage actors
British television actors
British video game actors
British male singers
Indie folk musicians
Male actors from Newcastle upon Tyne
21st-century British male actors
Royal Shakespeare Company members
1989 births